Brett Andrew Harvey (born 6 October 1959) is a former New Zealand rugby union player. A flanker, Harvey represented Wairarapa Bush at a provincial level. He played a single game for the New Zealand national side, the All Blacks, a test match against France in 1986.

References 

1959 births
Living people
Rugby union players from Palmerston North
People educated at Palmerston North Boys' High School
New Zealand rugby union players
New Zealand international rugby union players
Rugby union flankers
Wairarapa Bush rugby union players